Too Late may refer to:

Film and theatre
Too Late (1914 film), American film written by Winifred Dunn
 Too Late (1996 film), a Romanian film
 Too Late (2000 film), a Portuguese film
 Too Late (2015 film), an American film
 Too Late, a 1974 play by Gibson Kente

Songs
 "Too Late" (Dead by Sunrise song) , 2009
 "Too Late (True Love)", by the Real Milli Vanilli, 1991
 "Too Late", by Ayumi Hamasaki from A, 1999
 "Too Late", by Jennifer Lopez from On the 6, 1999
 "Too Late", by Jimmy Wakely from Ira and Charlie, 1958
 "Too Late", by Journey from Evolution, 1979
 "Too Late", by Junior from Ji, 1982
 "Too Late", by Labi Siffre from his self-titled debut album, 1970
 "Too Late", by M83 from Saturdays = Youth, 2008
 "Too Late", by No Doubt from Return of Saturn, 2000
 "Too Late", by Orchestral Manoeuvres in the Dark from Universal, 1996
 "Too Late", by the Paper Kites from Twelvefour, 2015
 "Too Late", by The Weeknd from After Hours, 2020
 "Too Late", by Wire from Chairs Missing, 1978
"Too Late", by SZA from SOS, 2022

See also 
 "Too Late Too Late", a song by Mr Hudson & The Library
 
 It's Too Late (disambiguation)